Gowri Putra is a 2012 Indian Kannada-language film directed by Manjunath M Maskal Matty, starring Akshay, Nikita Thukral and Nivedhitha in lead roles.

Cast

 Akshay as Ganesha 
 Nikita Thukral as Ranjitha
 Nivedhitha as Bharathi
 Nagashekar
 Rakesh Sharma
 Roopika as Nandhini
 Manasi as Jayanthi
 Soumya Sankalpa
 Ramesh Bhat
 Sihikahi Geetha

Music

Reception

Critical response 

B S Srivani from Deccan Herald scored the film at 3 out of 5 stars and says "Editing goes haywire, so does the lighting and camera shots before semblance of order is restored. Milind Dharmasen comes up with two decent numbers. A nice title, ‘Gowri Putra’ lacks that something to make it last". A critic from News18 India wrote " 'Gowri Putra' is an average affair. Though it is a family-oriented story, it has been presented badly". A critic from NDTV wrote "Akshay has done a good job in the role of Ganesh, but it is Nagashekhar, who scores in the role of Shekhar Nag. The film also scores in its technical values". A critic from The Times of India scored the film at 3 out of 5 stars and wrote "While Akshay has shown maturity, Nagashekar has done a wonderful job. Nikhitha’s role has been spoilt by poor dubbing. Niveditha is lively and Roopika is bubbly. Music by Milind Dharmasena has some catchy tunes. Cinematography by PL Ravee is impressive". A critic from Pinkvilla wrote "With two melodious tunes composed by Milind Dharmasena and neat picturisations, the film comes alive from its dragging narration".

References

2010s Kannada-language films
2012 films